The Main Event is a 1938 American comedy-drama film directed by Danny Dare, which stars Robert Paige, Jacqueline Wells, and Arthur Loft.

Cast list
 Robert Paige as Mac Richards
 Jacqueline Wells as Helen Phillips
 Arthur Loft as Jack Benson
 John Gallaudet as Joe Carter
 Thurston Hall as Captain Phillips
 Gene Morgan as Lefty
 Dick Curtis as Sawyer
 Oscar O'Shea as Captain Rorty
 Pat Flaherty as Moran
 John Tyrrel as Steve
 Nick Copeland as Jake
 Lester Dorr as Buck
 Leora Thatcher as Landlady
 Edward J. LeSaint as Watchman

References

External links
 
 
 

1938 comedy-drama films
American comedy-drama films
Columbia Pictures films
American black-and-white films
1938 films
1930s American films